SIC Comédia was a Portuguese TV channel, available on cable. It was part of the television network SIC (Sociedade Independente de Comunicação). It closed on 31 December 2006.

The channel aired shows such as Seinfeld, The Tonight Show, Late Night with Conan O'Brien, Cheers, The Benny Hill Show, M*A*S*H, Benson, Saturday Night Live, 'Allo 'Allo!, Comedy Inc., Mad About You, Everybody Loves Raymond, Frasier, My Hero, Alas Smith and Jones, The War Next Door. It also showed home-grown products (either reruns from the main channel or original commissions), such as Biqueirada, HermanSic and Prazer dos Diabos.

It is now defunct, because TVCabo, Portugal's main cable provider, decided to drop it despite a petition for it to continue. On TVCabo, Fox Life replaced it, and on TVTEL (another Portuguese cable provider), SIC Mulher got the spot.

History
The channel was announced by SIC in 2000 as SIC Gold as part of the channel's plans to enter the cable television market. The director of programs for the two channels (the other being SIC Radical), Francisco Penim, was appointed on April 14, 2000.The initial purpose of the channel was to carry programming from SIC's archives, similar to what RTP Memória has done since 2004. The channel was set to begin operations on June 26, 2000 but the lack of action from the regulatory body delayed its launch. The channel eventually started broadcasting on June 29, achieving good ratings, equiparable to the most-watched Portuguese-language basic cable channels of the time.

References

Defunct television channels in Portugal
Television channels and stations established in 2004
Television channels and stations disestablished in 2006
2004 establishments in Portugal
2006 disestablishments in Portugal